Scaphiophis is a genus of African snakes in the family Colubridae. Common names include hook-nosed snakes and shovel-nosed snakes.

Species
Two species are recognized as being valid.
Scaphiophis albopunctatus 
Scaphiophis raffreyi

Etymology
The specific name, raffreyi, is in honor of French scientific collector Achille Raffray.

References

Further reading
Boulenger GA (1894). Catalogue of the Snakes in the British Museum (Natural History). Volume II., Containing the Conclusion of the Colubridæ Aglyphæ. London: Trustees of the British Museum (Natural History). (Taylor and Francis, printers). xi + 382 pp. + Plates I-XX. (Genus Scaphiophis, p. 254).
Peters W (1870). "Eine Mittheilung über neue Amphibien ( ... Scaphiophis ... ) des Königlich zoologischen Museums ". Monatsberichte der Königlich Preussischen Akademie der Wissenschaften zu Berlin 1870: 641-652 + Plates I-II. (Scaphiophis, new genus, p. 644; Scaphiophis albopunctatus, new species, pp. 645–646 + Plate II, figures 4, 4a, 4b, 4c). (in German).

Colubrids
Snake genera
Taxa named by Wilhelm Peters